Halisa Air  was an airline from Haiti, which was operational from 1991 to 1998.

Company history
Halisa Air (Haitian Aviation Line SA) was founded in April 1994 by Frantz Cheron.  It operated mostly between Port-au-Prince, Toussaint Louverture International Airport (PAP) and Miami International Airport (MIA).  It was a passenger charter operator.  It is unclear when Halisa Air stopped flying.

Fleet details
2- Boeing 727-224F registration N6673Z
1- Boeing 727-251 registration N260US
1- Boeing 737-2L9 registration N171PL

All aircraft were leased.

References

Defunct airlines of Haiti
Airlines established in 1991
Airlines disestablished in 1998
1991 establishments in Haiti
Companies based in Port-au-Prince
1998 disestablishments in North America